Mapo was a weekly magazine published in Albania existed between 2006 and 2011.

History and profile
Mapo was started 2006 in as a joint initiative between the European University of Tirana and Albanian businessman, Agim Shënediella. It had an oppositional stance.

The magazine was closed on 9 September 2011. It is alleged that the reasons behind its closing the doors were not economical but were related to the magazine's anti-government stance. In 2012 it was restarted as a daily newspaper.

References

2006 establishments in Albania
2011 disestablishments in Albania
Albanian-language magazines
Defunct magazines published in Albania
Magazines established in 2006
Magazines disestablished in 2011
Mass media in Tirana
Weekly magazines